Daniela Bertol is an architect, designer and artist, working at the intersection between art and science. Her projects, based on a unified approach to knowledge, encompass several disciplines and media including astronomy, land art, geoglyphs, architecture, design, digital models, photography and video.

Biography

Daniela Bertol was born and grew up in Rome, where she earned a master's degree in Architecture; in 1985 she moved to the United States.  Bertol's early projects explored geometric space and virtual environments using digital model, where geometric forms evolved in organic components, similar to shapes found in nature. Bertol founded space ink in 1989 as a multidisciplinary laboratory embracing experimentally built and published projects as well as theoretical works focusing on the transformation of architecture and its integration with digital space. The vision that technological advancements should establish continuity with the past—instead of creating a fracture—has been expressed in architectural and educational projects, art installations, artwork, furniture and graphic design.
 
Bertol's most recent project is Sky Spirals, a series of places devoted to sustainable design: the shaping of the landscape  based on intersecting spirals follow solar and celestial alignments . Sky Spirals began as a conceptual work based on digital models, maps and aerial photos. As the work developed, the virtual model and diagrams were translated to a real physical site in Claverack, New York (USA). They became Sun Farm, the first site of the Sky Spirals concepts. The interest in sustainable architecture has inspired solar based design, such as the house at Sun Farm: contemporary architectural vocabulary and materials re-propose design intention from early civilizations.

Bertol's design vision integrates principles of eastern philosophies and practices with contemporary architectural theories and research. 
A lifelong yoga practitioner (and certified yoga teacher) she integrates spiritual practices in her artist and design work: several land art sculptures provide the path of walking meditations and yoga poses are included in the perception of architectural spaces.

Daniela Bertol is married with two daughters and lives in New York and Rome.

Books 
 Daniela Bertol, Visualizing with CAD (1994: New York: Springer-Verlag) 
 Daniela Bertol and David Foell, Designing Digital Space (1996: New York: John Wiley & Sons)

References and external links 

  official web site
  space ink web site

Year of birth missing (living people)
Living people
21st-century Italian women artists
Artists from Rome
Italian conceptual artists
Women conceptual artists
Land artists
Italian emigrants to the United States
People from Claverack, New York